Ong Keo led Austroasiatic-speaking minorities (formerly called Mon-Khmer) in what in Thailand was called the  Holy Man's Rebellion, where it was a widespread but short-lived cause. Against French and Lao forces, however, Ong Keo continued the struggle until his murder in 1910.  After his death, fighting still continued under his successor Ong Kommandam until at least 1937. Local legend holds that Ong Keo survived the murder attempt and lived until the early 1970s.

Early life
Ong Keo was an Alak, born in Ban Paktai, Muang  Thateng, in what then was part of the kingdom of Champasak, but now is in Xekong or Sekong Province.

His father was a village chief.  Ong Keo moved rapidly up the leadership ladder because of his charisma and intelligence, and his fluency in Lao and Pali.  He performed religious ceremonies on Mount Tayun, which was close to his home village.  He advocated that foreigners be thrown out.  His following grew quickly and soon they began calling him Pha Ong Keo ( − Wiktionary: prá ong gâew) − "Venerable Precious-Jewel," and a Phu Mi Boun (lit. "person have Buddhist merit"), usually translated in the messianic sense as The Holy Man.

Rebellion
He launched his rebellion in Thateng in response to the destruction of the temple of Ban Nong Mek.  This rebellion lasted six years before a truce could be made.  Phu Mi Boun surrendered to the French in October 1907 after military defeats, epidemics and famine disheartened his troops. Despite his surrender, he never submitted to the conditions the French laid on him. He continued to use the title of "Great King" that he had given himself, performed Buddhist/Alak religious rites and encouraged his disciples, particularly Ong Kommandam, to carry on his struggle.  In 1910, the French Commissioner of Saravane, Jean-Jacques Dauplay, ordered that he be killed for his "arrogant" attitude.  Some sources say that Dauplay himself killed Ong Keo after summoning him to a meeting, with a gun he had hid in his hat.

See also 
 The Art of Not Being Governed: An Anarchist History of Upland Southeast Asia (2009)
 Zomia (geography), a term used in the book

References

Year of birth missing
Laotian military leaders
1910 deaths
Assassinated military personnel
Deaths by firearm in Laos